The twentieth season of Law & Order: Special Victims Unit premiered on Thursday, September 27, 2018, at 9PM ET with a two-part premiere episode. The following Thursday, the series started airing new episodes at 10PM ET. The season ended on May 16, 2019.

This landmark season of SVU tied it with both the original Law & Order series and Gunsmoke as longest-running scripted non-animated U.S. primetime TV series. On March 29, 2019, as it was announced that SVU was renewed for a twenty-first, record-breaking season, it was also announced this season would be the last season to feature Philip Winchester.

Production
Law & Order: Special Victims Unit was renewed for a twentieth season on May 9, 2018. Production started on July 16, 2018. On July 12, 2018, Executive Producer Julie Martin posted a photo of a script on Twitter, teasing that the first hour of the two-hour season premiere was tentatively titled "Man Up". Martin teased on August 14, 2018, that the fourth episode of the season, titled "Revenge", would be "a devious twist and turn edge-of-your-seater". The episode also featured Callie Thorne as defense attorney Nikki Staines. A deleted scene featuring Benson and Noah from the previous season was re-shot and placed into the episode "Dear Ben", the scene being where Noah has a question about his father followed up by ADA Stone (Philip Winchester) taking Noah out to play baseball.  It was confirmed that Hargitay would direct the ninth episode of the season, titled "Mea Culpa", marking it the sixth episode she has directed for the series. On December 3, 2018, Julie Martin confirmed that the episode count for this season is 24. On March 1, 2019, it was announced that actress Lucy Liu would be directing the episode "Dearly Beloved," which aired April 4.

After the season wrapped production, it was announced that showrunner/executive producer Michael Chernuchin departed the show for another Wolf Films series, FBI on CBS. Former showrunner/EP Warren Leight (seasons 13-17) is set to return for the record-breaking 21st season. Executive producer/director Alex Chapple will join Chernuchin and will be replaced by Law & Order/Law & Order: Criminal Intent veteran executive producer/director Norberto Barba.

Cast

Main cast
 Mariska Hargitay as Lieutenant Olivia Benson
 Kelli Giddish as Senior Detective Amanda Rollins
 Ice-T as Senior Detective Sergeant Odafin "Fin" Tutuola
 Peter Scanavino as Junior Detective Dominick "Sonny" Carisi, Jr.
 Philip Winchester as Assistant District Attorney Peter Stone

Recurring cast

 Ryan Buggle as Noah Porter-Benson
 Vivian and Charlotte Cabell as Jesse Rollins 
 George Newbern as Dr. Al Pollack 
 Kurt Fuller as Civil Rights Attorney Jed Karey
 John Rothman as Judge Edward Kofax
 Sandrine Holt as Psychologist Lisa Abernathy 
 Ami Brabson as Judge Karyn Blake
 Lauren Noble as Carmen
 Yvonna Kopacz-Wright as Dr. Darby Wilder
 Jennifer Regan as Assistant District Attorney Kim Caldwell
 Carl Weathers as State’s Attorney Mark Jefferies
 Gillian Glasco as Officer Dominique Rivers
 Callie Thorne as Defense Attorney Nikki Staines
 Tom Titone as Judge Joshua Goldfarb
 Jolly Abraham as Dr. Patel
 Ngo Okafor as Wyatt
 Betsy Aidem as Dr. Sloane
 Aida Turturro as Judge Felicia Catano
 Alan Ariano as Judge Lee Wong
 William Oliver Watkins as Emergency Services Unit Officer Mido Hamid
 Paul Bomba as Officer Bobby Nardone
 Eddie Hargitay as Officer Eddie Montero
 Mary Hodges as Judge Anita Wright

 Michael Kostroff as Defense Attorney Evan Braun
 Erica Camarano as Officer Rachel Ortiz
 Kathryn Kates as Judge Marlene Simons
 Ned Eisenberg as Defense Attorney Roger Kressler
 Michael Mastro as Judge Serani
 Sarah Ellen Stephens as Officer Selena Gaines
 Barbara Miluski as Judge Lisa Peck
 Steve Rosen as Defense Attorney Michael Guthrie
 Brittany Jeffery as Defense Attorney Leah Simon
 Olga Merediz as Judge Roberta Martinez
 Vincent Curatola as Judge Al Bertuccio
 Joanne Baron as Defense Attorney Diane Schwartz
 Dov Tiefenbach as Medical Examiner Fitz
 Jenna Stern as Judge Elana Barth
 Dean Winters as District Attorney Investigator Brian Cassidy
 Edelen McWilliams as Crime Scene Unit Technician Martin
 Peter Gallagher as Deputy Chief William Dodds
 Titus Welliver as Rob Miller
 Jillian Rose as Attica Staines
 Joe Grifasi as Judge Hashi Horowitz
 Barrett Shuler as Sergeant Ryan Klypka
 Meredith Holzman as Counselor Naomi Ziegler
 Richard Kind as Defense Attorney William Biegel
 Tom Coiner as Officer Chuck Inslow

Guest stars
On July 13, 2018, Deadline announced that Scandals George Newbern would be guest starring over the course of the season in a recurring role as Dr. Al Pollack. Pollack is described as a charming, handsome, and wealthy doctor who is set to be a future as well as past love interest to Detective Amanda Rollins (Kelli Giddish). Rollins mentions him cheating on her with a prostitute in the previous season. Days later it was reported that Dylan Walsh would play John Conway, an abusive father who rapes his own son, in the season premiere. Walsh previously guest starred in the eighth season.

Carl Weathers reprised his role as his Chicago Justice character, State's Attorney Mark Jefferies, in the episode "Zero Tolerance". On August 16, 2018, The Hollywood Reporter announced that Homeland actress Sandrine Holt would be cast in a recurring role this season, as Dr. Lisa Abernathy, a clinical psychologist that consults on cases for the district attorney's office. Holt previously guest starred in the seventeenth season. On September 27, 2018, Entertainment Weekly reported that Sebastian Roché would guest star as Arlo Beck, the charismatic leader of a female empowerment group, in the episode "Accredo", which aired October 18, 2018. Roché previously made two guest appearances on the flagship series, Law & Order. Sasha Alexander guest starred as Anna Mill, a woman who murdered her husband and two children in the November 1st episode "Caretaker." On January 14, 2019, Julie Martin confirmed that Dean Winters would reprise his role as Brian Cassidy in February.

On January 22, 2019, it was confirmed Jennifer Esposito would be guest starring as Vice squad Sgt. Phoebe Baker in the episode "Brothel". Baker worked in Narcotics with Sgt. Tutuola before he transferred to SVU; she teams up with the SVU to investigate a chain of pop-up brothels where young women are found murdered. Esposito previously guest starred as a victim in the first season. On February 27, 2019, TV Line released that Titus Welliver would be guest starring in the episode "Blackout" as NYPD attorney, Rob Miller. Writer/EP Julie Martin on Twitter tweeted that Welliver would be returning in the last two episodes of the season. Rapper-actor Snoop Dogg guest-starred in the May 2 episode titled "Diss". The news was revealed by Ice-T on Twitter in a behind the scenes picture. In addition to Snoop Dogg, Orlando Jones, Amber Stevens West, and L. Scott Caldwell also guest-starred in the episode.

Episodes

Ratings

References

20
2018 American television seasons
2019 American television seasons